Carhart is a surname. Notable people with the surname include:

 Arthur Carhart (1892–1978), US Forest Service official, writer and conservationist who inspired wilderness protection in the United States
 Henry Smith Carhart Ph.B. (1844–1920), American physicist and university professor
 LeRoy Carhart (born 1941), American physician from Nebraska
 Raymond Carhart (born 1912), audiologist from Mexico City
 Thad Carhart (born 1950), American writer living in Paris
 Timothy Carhart (born 1953), American actor

See also 
 Gonzales v. Carhart, 550 U.S. 124 (2007), United States Supreme Court case which upheld the Partial-Birth Abortion Ban Act of 2003
 Stenberg v. Carhart, 530 U.S. 914 (2000), United States Supreme Court case which made performing partial-birth abortion illegal
 Carhart notch in an audiogram (a graph showing audible frequencies)
 Carhartt, American apparel company